The Gambia Senior Secondary School (formerly the Gambia High School) is a school in Box Bar Road, Banjul, Gambia, founded by Wesleyan missionaries. It has educated two leaders of Gambia.

History
The school was founded in 1876 in Dobson Street, Banjul, by Wesleyan missionaries. In 1898 it re-opened as the Methodist Boys' High School and in 1915 the associated Girls High School was opened.

The girls' and boys' high schools were merged in 1959 to create the Gambia High School and the location moved to Box Bar Road. Philip Beale was the principal from 1961 to 1966. While there he jointly organised an archaeological expedition with pupils from the school to examine the Senegambian stone circles. In 1994, the name changed again to the Gambia Senior Secondary School.

Notable alumni
Fatim Badjie, Minister of Communications, Information and Information Technology and Minister of Health and Social Welfare, youngest person ever appointed to the Gambian Cabinet.
Fatou Lamin Faye, Minister of Education from 2004
 Yahya Jammeh, leader of the Gambia from 1994 to 2017.
 Dawda Jawara, prime minister of Gambia from 1962 to 1970.
Bai Modi Joof, lawyer
Fatou Sanyang Kinteh, Minister for Women's Affairs, Children and Social Welfare

Principals

1876 to 1958

 1876–1878 Rev. J. Fieldhouse
 1878–1879 Rev. J. Heslam
 1879–1884 C.R. Cross
 1885–1889 J. Gilbert
 1889–2900 G.P. Wilhelm
 1901–1904 Circuits Ministers
 1904–1907 W. T. Cole
 1907–1909 Rev. C. Leopold
 1909–1911 A.N. Walker
 1912–1913 F. Dean
 1913–1920 Rev. L.L. Leopold
 1921–1922 W.E. Hoare
 1922–1928 Rev. F.F. Morton
 1929–1931 H.E.E. Burne
 1932–1952 J.J. Baker
 1953–1958 R.P. Pye

Girls High School

 1915–1917 Mrs. P.S Toye
 1922–1927 Miss L.E Morton
 1928–1929 Miss C.E. Mason
 1929–1936 Miss. R.M. Little
 1937–1938 Miss. A.I. Spencer
 1939–1956 Miss. N. Spencer
 1957–1958 Miss. V. Vodlcy

Gambia High School

 1959–1961 J.S. Sergeants
 1961–1966 P.E. Beale
 1966–1974 E.F. Foss
 1974–1976 J.J. Ndow
 1976–1978 H.I. Jagne
 1978–1980 R.D. Somers
 1980–1986 H.I. Jagne
 1986–1989 Mrs. D.E.S. Carrol
 1989–1994 Mrs. Satang Jaw
 1994–2005 Rev. W.E.E. Carr
 2005 - date Lamin M.B. Jaiteh

References

External links 

High schools and secondary schools in the Gambia
1876 establishments in Africa
Banjul
Wesleyan schools
Schools founded by missionaries
Educational institutions established in 1876
1876 establishments in the British Empire